Calclamnoidea is an extinct genus of sea cucumber which existed in Poland during the Triassic period.

References

Fossils of Poland
Calclamnidae
Prehistoric sea cucumber genera
Triassic echinoderms
Middle Triassic first appearances
Late Jurassic extinctions
Fossil taxa described in 1955